Rodolfo Bebán (25 May 1938 – 14 August 2022) was an Argentine actor. He appeared in more than forty films between 1962 and 2022. 

Bebán died on 14 August 2022, at the age of 84.

Selected filmography

References

External links 

 

1938 births
2022 deaths
Argentine male film actors
20th-century Argentine male actors
21st-century Argentine male actors